The Chüealphorn is a mountain of the Albula Alps, overlooking the Scaletta Pass, in Graubünden, Switzerland.

References

External links
 Chüealphorn on Hikr

Mountains of the Alps
Alpine three-thousanders
Mountains of Switzerland
Mountains of Graubünden
Davos
S-chanf